United Bamboo is a fashion brand founded in 1998 by designers Thuy Pham and Miko Aoki.  
The designers issue an annual calendar of well dressed cats.  The outfits used in the calendar have been put on sale, priced at $500.

References

External links
 Official Site
 NY Mag Label Overview
 Style.com Designer Directory

Clothing brands of the United States